Frank Gibb may refer to:

 Frank W. Gibb (died 1932), American architect
 Frank Gibb (cricketer) (1868–1957), English cricketer